Zamthang County or Ndzamthang County, or Rangtang County is a county in the northwest of Sichuan Province, China, bordering on the Banma County of Qinghai Province to the north. It is one of 13 counties under the administration of and lies the westernmost county-level division of the Ngawa Tibetan and Qiang Autonomous Prefecture. Zamthang is on the upper reaches of the Dadu River, bordering the Barkam County and Aba County on the east and northeast, and adjoining Jinchuan County on the south, and Sêrtar County, Luhuo County and Dawu County in the west and south. Zamthang, which means "The field of Caishen" in Tibetan, lies in the southeast of the Tibetan Plateau and in the historical region of Amdo. The vast majority of the population is Tibetan(30200), followed by Han people(3949), Qiang people(269) and Hui people(78).

History
In 1958, according to the result of the 81st conference of State Council, Zamthang county was founded. The name of the county was retrieved from a natural village located in the current administrative region of the county. The village was located on a hill shaped like a Jambhala holding a Dhvaja. According to the Tibetan-Chinese dictionary published by Publishing House of Minority Nationalities, Jambhala in Tibetan means Caishen in Chinese,  therefore "Jambhala" was retrieved to be part of the county's name(). Also, there was a flat ground located in front of the hill, in Tibetan, "thang" means "ground" or "field", therefore, the second part was retrieved as "thang"(). Therefore, the county's name is the combination of "Jambhala" and "thang". In order to simplify the name, the government took "Jam" in "Jambhala" as "Zam"() and made the county's name "Zamthang"().

Culture

Jonang Buddhism 
Between Xiangla Dongji Holy Mountain Scenic Area and Haizi Mountain Scenic Area, which are the two most famous touristic attraction in Zamthang, bred the religion of Jonang Buddhism, one of the schools of Tibetan Buddhism. The other schools are Nyingma(), Kagyu(), Sakya(), Kadam(), Gelug(), gcod yul() and Bon(the relationship to Tibetan Buddhism is controversial)(). The symbols of Jonang Buddhism in Zamtang are 3 famous temples with the name of Querji Temple, Zangwa Temple, and Zebuji temple， all of which are originated from The East SangzhuLuobuling monastery built in 1435 BC. The architecture of the monastery is integrated, made it shaped like a small town. There was also another statement that instead of a small village, the name of the county was actually from the monastery. The builder of the monastery was called Zhong, who was an influential man in Ming dynasty. Zhong was named "The master of Promoting the doctrine" by the imperial court of Ming dynasty.

Language 
Most of the Tibetan people in Zamthang are Gyalrong people()，and they mainly speak Amdo Tibetan, which is one of four main spoken Tibetic languages, the other three are Central Tibetan, Khams Tibetan and Ladakhi language. The people who speak Amdo Tibetan can not understand the people who speak the other three Tibetic languages, because although these four languages share the same written script, their phonology, grammar and vocabulary are quite different. Therefore, Zamthang people cannot directly talk to Lhasa people, unless they specifically go learn the Central Tibetan language. More specifically, the Amdo Tibetan is not a tonal and retains many word-initial consonant clusters that have been lost in Central Tibetan.

The 9-floor Maitreya Pagoda 
The 9-floor Maitreya Pagoda in Zamthang could be regarded as an exhibition hall of Buddharupa, displaying various Buddharupa including Murals, Thangka paintings(), Clay Statues and some Metal Statues. What's interesting about the Pagoda is that Outside the wall of the 9th floor of the pagoda, each side has a row of stone slabs protruding from the wall, about 20 cm in length, and exactly one-foot board is placed on it. The explorer can come out from the gate of the tower, hold the tower body in his hand, move his/her steps on this row of suspended stone slabs, and turn around the pagoda.

Lhamo in Nanmuda Town 
This Lhamo in Nanmuda is one of the Lhamo that mainly performed in Amdo district, and it performs in Amdo Tibetan or Amdo folk singings.

Sculpture and painting 
Sculptures and paintings are a must-look in the religious culture and art of Zamthang area. There are clay sculptures, woodcut or woodcarving sculptures, brick carving sculptures, sculptures made of Yak butter and sandpaintings, all of which have perfect and vivid shapes. The Buddharupa in temples are mainly clay sculptures and woodcarving sculptures, where woodcarving sculptures are generally used on lintels, pillar windows and other buildings, with dragons, tigers, lions and Ashtamangalas symbolizing good luck engraved on it. The brick carving sculptures are mainly used to construct the roof lace of Tibetan-style buildings, animals on the cornice and relieves on the windowpane. Sandpaintings are mainly to draw Thangka paintings() and Murals. Thangkas, called religious scroll paintings, are painted with brocade, silk embroidery, and colour paintings. As a treasure of Tibetan religious art, they have precious value and are enshrined in temples or Tibetan homes. The murals are mainly used to decorate the temple corridors.

Apparel 
Tibetan costumes in Zamthang have materials mainly used sheepskin and pupu (wool material woven with wool). The Zamthang robe is long, with a broad front and border. In some Tibetan festivals, people in Zamthang will Wear a felt hat, a silk ribbon around the waist, a waist knife. Many Tibetan robes use cloths or high-grade cloths, and colourful silk or precious otter skin (or other animal skins). The costume is inlaid with expensive coral, agate, turquoise, jade or gold and silver. A Tibetan robe is extremely valuable.

Weddings and funerals 
Zamthang is located in a traditional Tibetan pastoral area，the relationship between men and women is free, but marriage requires parental consent. The date of marriage is usually determined by the Living Buddha or lama. 
The Tibetan funerals in Zamthang are religious funerals with Tibetan traditions. cremation was only used for lama or respectable people in ancient times, while it became popular among normal Tibetan people after the new millennium and have certain specifications. Babies or children are usually buried in water. Only villains or bad persons are buried in the ground.

Administrative divisions
Zamthang comprises 9 townships, 3 towns and 63 villages. 
The 9 townships and 3 towns are:
Towns
Rangke
Nanmuda
Middle Zamthang
Townships:
Puxi
Zongke
Shili
Wuyi
Gangmuda
Shangduke
Rongmuda
Gaduo
Upper Zamthang

Climate

References

Ngawa Tibetan and Qiang Autonomous Prefecture
County-level divisions of Sichuan